She'll Have to Go (released in the United States as Maid for Murder) is a 1962 black and white British comedy film directed by Robert Asher and starring Bob Monkhouse.

Plot
When cash strapped brothers Francis and Douglas discover their wealthy grandmother has bequeathed the family fortune to distant cousin Toni, a French maid, they immediately start plotting. When Toni visits, both men attempt to woo her, but when their efforts fail, they decide on murder as their likeliest option to acquire the money.

Cast
 Bob Monkhouse as Francis Oberon
 Alfred Marks as Douglas Oberon
 Hattie Jacques as Miss Richards
 Anna Karina as Toni
 Dennis Lotis as Gilbert
 Graham Stark as Arnold
 Clive Dunn as Chemist
 Hugh Lloyd as Macdonald
 Peter Butterworth as Doctor
 Harry Locke as Stationmaster
 Pat Coombs as Train Passenger
 Larry Taylor as Train Driver

References

External links

1962 films
1962 comedy films
British black-and-white films
British independent films
Films directed by Robert Asher
British comedy films
Films shot at MGM-British Studios
1960s English-language films
1960s British films